Georgensgmünd is a municipality in the district of Roth, in Bavaria, Germany.

Mayors
 1972-1990: Fritz Schönwald (SPD)	
 1990-2008: Klaus Wernard (SPD)	
 2008-2011: Eva Loch (CSU)	
since 2011: Ben Schwarz (SPD)

References

External links
 

Roth (district)